Murray Zeuschner (born 25 November 1938) is a former Australian rules footballer who played with Footscray in the Victorian Football League (VFL). Zeuschner was ruckman and defender. After an unsuccessful attempt to break into the senior Carlton side through their reserve team, he moved to Footscray and found a regular place in the side.

Sources
Holmesby, Russell & Main, Jim (2007). The Encyclopedia of AFL Footballers. 7th ed. Melbourne: Bas Publishing.

External links
 
 

1938 births
Living people
Australian rules footballers from Victoria (Australia)
Western Bulldogs players